Gadea is a surname. Notable people with the surname include:

Hilda Gadea (1921–1974), Peruvian economist, Communist leader, and writer
Kelly Gadéa (born 1991), French footballer
Manuel Gadea (born 1942), Uruguayan basketball player
Sergio Gadea (born 1984), Spanish motorcycle racer